Joyce Chu (born 7 March 1997; nicknamed 'Si Ye Cao', literally "four-leaf clover") is a Malaysian singer-songwriter and actress. She is best known for her viral songs "Malaysia Chabor" and "I Miss You", whose catchy melodies became internet sensation. In 2020, she participated in the Chinese girl group competition show Produce Camp 2020 (Chuang 2020), where she ranked 9th. She is now a solo singer.

Early life
Joyce Chu is a local Malaysian Chinese, born and raised in Johor Bahru, Johor, Malaysia. She has an older sister, Joana, and an older brother, Joey, who starred in some of her YouTube videos. She studied in Si Ling Secondary School in Singapore, but decided not to further her studies after completing GCE 'O' Level examination to focus on her career. She plays piano, guitar and ukulele.

Career
In 2014, she was scouted by Namewee and joined his company label RED People. She debuted with the song "Malaysia Chabor". Upon debuting, the song instantly received widespread attention in Malaysia and she was launched into overnight stardom. The song was composed by Namewee, in the lyrics she tells others that she is a "Malaysian Chabor" (Malaysian girl), and not Korean which is what people assumed. The word 'chabor' means girl in Hokkien. The song spawned covers and parodies. The MV video has since reached around 27 million views on YouTube.

In October 2014, Chu released a song "Your Little Round Hand" for the 100th anniversary of Doraemon. In November 2015, Chu release her first EP, "Joyce Chu" with three songs, and started debuting in Taiwan.

The lead song "I Miss You" from the EP, became an instant hit and went viral due to its catchy lyrics and melodies. This song was also covered by other celebrities and singers, such as Happy Polla and TFBoys, leading to a further rise in popularity. The MV has since garnered around 58 million views on YouTube. Subsequently, "I Miss You 2.0" featuring Namewee, and a Vietnamese version were released.

In May 2016, she starred in the Singaporean comedy film, Young & Fabulous. She is the lead role alongside Aloysius Pang, Jeffrey Xu and Joshua Tan in the film about cosplay. In June 2016, Chu was one of the main participants in the Chinese music reality show Heroes of Remix, under the mentorship of Wang Leehom.

In December 2016, she released her second EP "Together / Merry Cold Christmas", with three songs. In 2017, she released a song "Simple Love" with local singer Michiyo Yo; and the cover song "The Never Old Legend" from Jacky Cheung. In December 2017, she released her first studio album ''Where It All Started'', with ten songs.

In 2018, Chu starred in Taiwanese web drama, Music in Love. In 2019, she has a cameo in the Thailand romantic comedy film Friend Zone, and is one of the Southeast Asian singers for its main OST. She also recorded the opening song for Chinese drama series Le Coup de Foudre.

In April 2020, she acted in the Taiwanese drama series I, Myself. She is one of the main cast in the self-healing themed series and acts in Taiwanese Hokkien. In May 2020, she participates in the Chinese girl group competition show Produce Camp 2020 (Chuang 2020), where she is one of the two trainees from Southeast Asia. She successfully entered the final round, and finished with 9th place.

Discography

As solo artist

Studio albums
Where It All Started 我來自四葉草 (2017)

EPs
Joyce Chu 四叶草 (2015)
Together / Merry Cold Christmas 在一起 / 冷冷 der 聖誕節 (2016)

Singles

With Red People

Albums
 Red Red People Red Red Year 红红年 (2015)

Singles

Filmography

Films

Series

References

External links
 
 
 
 Joyce Chu on YouTube
 

1997 births
Avex Group artists
Malaysian Christians
Malaysian people of Hokkien descent
Malaysian people of Chinese descent
Malaysian women singer-songwriters
21st-century Malaysian women singers
Malaysian Mandopop singers
Malaysian YouTubers
Malaysian expatriates in Singapore
Living people
Si Ling Secondary School alumni